Palo Verde is a small populated place in Maricopa County, Arizona, United States.

Brief history
The Palo Verde area was settled in 1886, by John G. Roberts and family. Mr. Roberts helped in the construction of the Arizona and Buckeye canals, served a term as cattle inspector, and was deputy sheriff at Buckeye under three Maricopa County sheriffs. One of the first structures built, which still stands today, was the Palo Verde Baptist Church, organized in 1890.

Despite sharing a name, the Palo Verde Nuclear Generating Station is located in nearby Wintersburg.

Palo Verde exists as a county island within the planning boundary of Buckeye. This precludes any possibility of incorporation for the community, but annexation into Buckeye is a possibility.

In 1995, a train derailment occurred near the town of Palo Verde.

References

Populated places in Maricopa County, Arizona